Islam Khan Mashadi (reigned: 1635–1639) was the Mughal Subahdar of Bengal. His original name was Mir Abdus Salam.
He was also served high service in Viceroy of Kabul from 1647 to 1656.

History
In 1639, soon after the Ahom-Mughal and Arakan-Mughal battles, Islam Khan Mashhadi was recalled to Delhi to assume the post of Wazir (Prime Minister). Prince Shah Shuja succeeded him as the new governor of Bengal. Islam Khan II  became the governor of the Deccan provinces in the year 1646-1647 until his death.

See also
List of rulers of Bengal
History of Bengal
History of India

References

Subahdars of Bengal
Grand viziers of the Mughal Empire